Epidendrum capricornu, the goat-horned epidendrum, is a species of orchid in the genus Epidendrum.

capricornu
Plants described in 1916